The men's 100 metres event at the 1955 Pan American Games was held at the Estadio Universitario in Mexico City on 13 and 14 March.

Medalists

Results

Heats
Held on 13 March

Semifinals
Held on 14 March

Final
Held on 14 March

References

Athletics at the 1955 Pan American Games
1955